Jyotipriya Mallick is an Indian politician and the present Minister for Department of Forest Affairs and Non-Conventional and Renewable Energy Sources in the Government of West Bengal. He previously served as the Minister for Food & Supplies in the Government of West Bengal. He is also an MLA, elected from the Habra constituency in the 2011 West Bengal state assembly election. In 2016 and 2021 assembly election he was re-elected from the same constituency.

References 

State cabinet ministers of West Bengal
Living people
1958 births